Larkana Division  is an administrative division of the Sindh Province of Pakistan. It was created in 1980 by bifurcation of Sukkur Division. In 2000 abolished by General Pervaiz Musharraf rule but Sindh government restored it again on 11 July 2011.

Larkana is the divisional headquarters of Larkana Division. It comprises the following districts:

Jacobabad District 

 Garhi Khairo Tehsil
 Jacobabad Tehsil
 Thul Tehsil

Kashmore District 

 Kandhkot Tehsil
 Kashmore Tehsil
 Tangwani Tehsil

Larkana District 

 Bakrani Tehsil
 Dokri Tehsil
 Larkana Tehsil
 Ratodero Tehsil

Qambar-Shahdadkot District 

 Mirokhan Tehsil
 Nasirabad Tehsil
 Qambar Tehsil
 Qubo Saeed Khan Tehsil
 Shahdadkot Tehsil
 Sijawal Junejo Tehsil
 Warah Tehsil

Shikarpur District 

 Garhi Yasin Tehsil
 Khanpur Tehsil
 Lakhi Tehsil
 Shikarpur Tehsil

References

See Also
 Jacobabad District
 Larkana District
 Kashmore District
 Qambar Shahdadkot District
 Shikarpur District
 Larkana

Divisions of Sindh